Pambula River is an open semi-mature wave dominated barrier estuary or perennial river located in the South Coast region of New South Wales, Australia.

Course and features
Pambula River rises in timbered highlands near the locality of Lochiel and flows generally east, flowing through Pambula Lake, before reaching its mouth into the Tasman Sea of the South Pacific Ocean near the locality of Pambula Beach. The river descends  over its  course.

South of Pambula, the Princes Highway crosses the river.

See also

 Rivers of New South Wales
 List of rivers of New South Wales (L–Z)
 List of rivers of Australia

References

External links
 

 

Rivers of New South Wales
South Coast (New South Wales)